Berwind Corporation (previously also known as Berwind-White Coal Mining Company) is a large privately held American corporation historically involved in the coal industry.  Today it is a diversified company involved in property leasing and ownership of unrelated businesses.

It began as a partnership of Edward Julius Berwind, Charles Berwind, and Congressman Allison White and upon White's death became known as Berwind White Company in 1886. The company was one of the largest producers of coal at the turn of the twentieth century and created several towns in West Virginia and Pennsylvania, including Windber, Pennsylvania and Berwind, West Virginia. It was a litigant in two U.S. Supreme Court decisions: Berwind-White Coal Mining Co. v. Chicago & Erie R. Co., 235 U.S. 371 (1914) and McGoldrick v. Berwind-White Coal Mining Co., 309 U.S. 33 (1940). In 1962 the family corporation moved from directly producing coal to leasing its properties and diversification into ownership of other businesses, including Protective Industries (including Caplugs and Mokon) and, CRC Industries. By 2007 the company's investments in real estate alone totaled over $3 billion. Berwinds founded the Wilmore Steamship Company in 1930.

Companies
Berwind Corporations companies:
Colorcon, pharmaceutical
CRC Industries, chemical
Maxcess, automation systems
Oliver, Healthcare packaging 
Caplugs, plastic molding
TASI Group, test and measurement
Berwind Natural Resources Corporation (BNRC), land and resource management company

See also
World War II United States Merchant Navy

References

External links
Official Berwind Website
Companies Owned By Berwind

 
Privately held companies based in Pennsylvania
Non-renewable resource companies established in 1886
Coal companies of the United States
Real estate companies established in 1962
Companies based in Philadelphia